The Polanyi Medal is a biennial award of the Royal Society of Chemistry for outstanding contributions to the field of gas kinetics. The medal is presented at the International Symposium on Gas Kinetics after a plenary lecture given by the prize winner.

The award is named after the Hungarian-British polymath Michael Polanyi, 1891-1976, whose research helped to establish the topic of gas kinetics and reaction dynamics. His son, John Polanyi, received the Polanyi Medal in 1988.

Winners
Source:

See also

 List of chemistry awards

References

Awards of the Royal Society of Chemistry